Acacia flexifolia, commonly known as bent-leaf wattle or small winter wattle, is  a shrub species that is endemic to eastern Australia.

Description
The branchlets have tiny hairs between resinous ridges and tend to be angled at the extremities. Like most Acacias it has phyllodes instead of true leaves. They have a narrowly oblanceolate to linear shape and can be straight or slightly curved.

Taxonomy
The species was first formally described by the botanist George Bentham in 1842 as part of William Jackson Hooker's work Notes on Mimoseae, with a synopsis of species as published in the London Journal of Botany. It was reclassified in 1987 as Racosperma flexifolium by Leslie Pedley, then transferred back to genus Acacia'' in 2001.

Distribution
It is found of the eastern states of Australia from Queensland, through New South Wales and into Victoria inland and along the Great Dividing Range where it is usually a component of woodlands, usually dry sclerophyll forest and mallee communities in inland districts.

See also
 List of Acacia species

References

flexifolia
Flora of New South Wales
Flora of Queensland
Flora of Victoria (Australia)
Fabales of Australia
Taxa named by Allan Cunningham (botanist)
Taxa named by George Bentham
Plants described in 1842